Banksia octotriginta is a species of shrub that is endemic to the south-west of Western Australia. It has erect stems with bluish-green, deeply pinnatipartite leaves, heads of up to eighty or more golden-yellow flowers and egg-shaped follicles.

Description
Banksia octotriginta is a shrub with erect stems that typically grows to a height of  but does not form a lignotuber.

Taxonomy and naming
This species was first formally described in 1996 by Alex George in the journal Nuytsia and given the name Dryandra octotriginta from specimens he collected near Nyabing in 1986. The specific epithet (octotriginta) is a Latin word meaning "thirty-eight", referring to number given to the species in a list of new species prepared by a Dryandra Study Group.

In 2007, Austin Mast and Kevin Thiele transferred all the dryandras to the genus Banksia and this species became Banksia octotriginta.

Distribution and habitat
Banksia octotriginta grows in kwongan, often with mallee eucalypts and occurs between Woodanilling, Nyabing, Newdegate and Dragon Rocks.

Ecology
An assessment of the potential impact of climate change on this species found that it was likely to be driven to extinction by loss of habitat by 2080, even under mild climate change scenarios.

Conservation status
Banksia octotriginta is classified as "not threatened" by the Western Australian Government Department of Parks and Wildlife.

References

octotriginta
Plants described in 1996
Taxa named by Alex George